Manuel Armando Cortez (born 24 May 1979 in Freiburg im Breisgau) is a German-Portuguese actor, creative director and photographer.

Life and career

At the age of ten, he visited the children's drama school in Lisbon. Shortly after, he graduated from an acting and vocal training school. He also trained as a hairdresser and make-up artist with focus on special effects.

He has worked in films including Asudem, by Daryush Shokof, Die Nacht der lebenden Loser, Highway Speeder, and Fucking Fish. One of his bigger roles was that of Rokko Kowalski in the Sat.1 program Verliebt in Berlin. From 2011 to April 2012, he was seen in Anna und die Liebe as the male lead, Luca Benzoni.

Manuel Cortez lives in Berlin. In the second season of X Factor in Germany, Cortez acted as art director.

References

External links
  
 

1979 births
Living people
Actors from Freiburg im Breisgau
German male film actors
German comedy musicians
German people of Portuguese descent